Francis Wright (13 March 1874 – 10 October 1899) was an Australian cricketer. He played one first-class cricket match for Victoria in 1898.

See also
 List of Victoria first-class cricketers

References

External links
 

1874 births
1899 deaths
Australian cricketers
Victoria cricketers
Sportspeople from Ballarat